MPavilion is a temporary pavilion in Queen Victoria Gardens, Melbourne, erected annually since 2014. The event is sponsored by philanthropist Naomi Milgrom. Initially the project was planned for four years, but later it was extended by another two, until 2019. It is used for various art events, after which each pavilion is gifted to the city and moved to a permanent location.

The first pavilion was designed by Sean Godsell, and was later relocated to the Hellenic Museum. The second pavilion was designed by UK-based architect Amanda Levete in 2015, and later relocated to Docklands. The third pavilion was a bamboo structure designed by Bijoy Jain of Studio Mumbai, later relocated to the Melbourne Zoo. In 2017, the pavilion was designed by Rem Koolhaas and David Gianotten, and is OMA's first completed design in Australia. It has been relocated to the Clayton campus of Monash University. The 2018 pavilion was designed by Spanish architect Carme Pinós. The architect of the 2019 pavilion was Glenn Murcutt

Year - Architect
 2014: Sean Godsell
 2015: Amanda Levete
 2016: Bijoy Jain 
 2017: Rem Koolhaas and David Gianotten
 2018: Carme Pinós
 2019: Glenn Murcutt
 2021: MAP Studio
 2022: all(zone) / Rachaporn Choochuey

See also
Serpentine Galleries#Pavilions

References

External links
Official website

Buildings and structures in the City of Melbourne (LGA)
Pavilions
2014 establishments in Australia